Thea Belmer (born 1941, Amsterdam) is a former artistic gymnast.

Belmer had her most successful year in 1963, when in April she won a gold medal on uneven bars and a silver medal on vault at the 1963 European Championships and in December won the national championships. At the world championships in Dortmund in 1966, she was a member of the Dutch team, that came in 14th of 22 teams. 

Belmer married Piet Uijtendaal on 9 December 1966 in Amsterdam, after which she retired from competitive gymnastics and moved to live in Wormer.

References

1941 births
Living people
Dutch female artistic gymnasts
European champions in gymnastics
Gymnasts from Amsterdam
20th-century Dutch women
20th-century Dutch people
21st-century Dutch women